State Highway Loop 88 (Loop 88) is a proposed state highway in Lubbock County, Texas, that will form a bypass around the city of Lubbock. The Loop 88 designation has been approved by local governments such as Lubbock, Texas  while the Texas Department of Transportation (TxDOT) builds the project, currently known as the Lubbock Outer Route.

The route will start at the intersection of U.S. Highway 84 (US 84) northwest of Lubbock near Shallowater and head south and intersect State Highway 114 (SH 114) near Reese Center and continue towards Wolfforth where it will intersect US 62 and US 82 then head east toward US 87 and Slaton, where it will end at US 84. The southern stretch from Wolfforth to Slaton will overlap Farm to Market Road 1585. The highway will serve as a bypass for US 84 around Lubbock; the current route of US 84 through the city will be re-designated as U.S. Route 84 Business upon the completion of Loop 88.

TxDOT began construction in late 2021. The loop will be built in 4 segments: segments 1 and 2 will be from US 84 near Shallowater to US 62/82 near Wolfforth; segment 3 will be from US 62/82 to US 87 in south Lubbock; and segment 4 will be from US 87 to US 84 near Slaton. Construction is expected to last 12 to 15 years.

History
An earlier route, also designated as Loop 88 was designated on December 18, 1939 from U.S. Highway 83 through San Ygnacio to another point on US 83. On June 21, 1990, this route was cancelled, as it was transferred to Business US 83-N. The current route was proposed to be Loop 88 in 2016, but was not officially designated as Loop 88 until July 27, 2017.

Construction
The project was partially stalled in late 2017 when TxDOT found what it thought to be either mammoth or bison bones near the intersection of FM 179 and 130th Street during an environmental impact study. Groundbreaking was held on November 3, 2021 near the intersection of FM 1585 (future Loop 88) and Indiana Avenue.

Exit list

See also

External links
 Map of Planned Corridor

References

88
U.S. Route 84
Transportation in Lubbock County, Texas
Freeways in Texas